Justin Liu (born May 28, 1991) is a Singaporean sailor. He and Denise Lim placed 19th in the Nacra 17 event at the 2016 Summer Olympics.

References

External links
 

1991 births
Living people
Singaporean male sailors (sport)
Olympic sailors of Singapore
Sailors at the 2016 Summer Olympics – Nacra 17
420 class world champions
World champions in sailing for Singapore
Asian Games medalists in sailing
Sailors at the 2006 Asian Games
Sailors at the 2010 Asian Games
Medalists at the 2006 Asian Games
Medalists at the 2010 Asian Games
Asian Games gold medalists for Singapore
Southeast Asian Games gold medalists for Singapore
Southeast Asian Games medalists in sailing
Competitors at the 2007 Southeast Asian Games